Crayon Shin-chan is a Japanese manga series written and illustrated by Yoshito Usui. It first appeared in 1990 in the Japanese weekly magazine Weekly Manga Action, published by Futabasha. It started as a spin-off of the character Shinnosuke Nikaido (二階堂信之介) of another series by Yoshito Usui, Darakuya Store Monogatari (だらくやストア物語). The chapters were collected into 50 tankōbon volumes, which were published under Futabasha's Action Comics imprint, from April 11, 1992 to July 10, 2010.

Yoshito Usui died on September 11, 2009 after a fall at Mount Arafune. After Usui died, Futabasha originally planned to end Crayon Shin-chan in November 2009. Upon discovering new manuscripts, Futabasha decided to extend the comic's run until the March 2010 issue of the magazine, which shipped on February 5, 2010. Although the series formally ended on February 5, 2010, it was announced on December 1, 2009 that a new manga would begin in the summer of 2010 by members of Usui's team, titled .

A series of four bilingual Japanese-English manga were released in 1996 in Japan as Shin-chan The Little Horror! (クレヨンしんちゃんの楽しいゾ英会話).

ComicsOne translated ten volumes of Crayon Shin-chan into English and released it in the United States. Occasional pop culture references familiar to Americans were added to increase the appeal to American audiences. The manga is mirrored from its original to read from left to right. Starting with the sixth volume, many of the names were changed to the ones used in the Phuuz English version of the anime, even though the dub never aired in North America. This translation is rated Teen.

Since then, American publisher DrMaster took over the licenses of several manga series, including Crayon Shin-chan, from ComicsOne. No new volumes of Crayon Shin-chan were released under the DrMaster imprint.

On July 28, 2007, DC Comics' manga division CMX announced the acquisition of the Crayon Shin-chan manga. The CMX version is rated Mature instead of Teen from ComicsOne, because of nudity, sexual humor, and bad language.
The first volume was released on February 27, 2008, with uncensored art, and the style of jokes that frequent the Adult Swim dub with some throw backs to the original version, such as his original greeting. However, volume 10 omitted a gag which was in the ComicsOne version.

On April 11, 2012, One Peace Books announced their release of the manga, which is a reprint of the CMX version, in an omnibus format. Three omnibus volumes were released simultaneously on October 15, 2012. Volume 4 was released on November 13, 2013 and included the Japanese volume 12, marking the first time that particular volume has an English translation.

The Crayon Shin-chan manga spin-off, Action Mask, is currently available as read-only/print-only subscription from Crunchyroll and Futabasha. The main Shin-chan manga is also available from Crunchyroll using the CMX version, concurrently up to volume 10.

Crayon Shin-chan - Japanese original

New Crayon Shin-chan - Japanese original

Shin-chan: The Little Horror! (Crayon Shin-chan's Fun English Conversation)

Crayon Shin-chan - English - ComicsOne

Crayon Shin-chan - English - CMX

Crayon Shin-chan - English - One Peace Books

Action Mask (spin-off)

References

 
Crayon Shin-chan